Reimer is a family name of Germanic or Dutch origin.

Notable people with this surname 

 Al Reimer (1927-2015), Canadian writer
 Andrea Reimer, Canadian politician
 A. James Reimer (1942–2010), Canadian Mennonite theologian
 Arthur E. Reimer (1882–1969), American political candidate for the Socialist Labor Party of America
 Bennett Reimer, American musician
 Birgitte Reimer (1926-2021), Danish actress
 Brittany Reimer (born 1988), Canadian swimmer
 Christine Reimer, Danish journalist
 Daniela Reimer, German rower
 David Reimer (1965–2004), Canadian man raised as a girl who became a famous case study in sexology
 David Dale Reimer, American diplomat
 Dennis Reimer (born 1939), Chief of Staff of the United States Army 1995-1999
 Doug Reimer, Canadian volleyball player
 Erwin Reimer, Chilean athlete
 Eugene Reimer, Canadian athlete
 Jack Reimer, Canadian politician
 Jakob Reimer (1918–2005), a Trawniki concentration camp guard 
 James Reimer, Canadian ice hockey player
 Jeffrey Reimer, American chemist
 John Reimer, Canadian politician 
 Josef Ludwig Reimer, Austrian writer
 Georg Reimer, German painter
 Helmut Reimer, German computer scientist
 Klaas Reimer (1770–1837), founder of the Kleine Gemeinde
 Linda Reimer, Canadian politician
 Luke Reimer, Australian rugby player
 Mary Jean Reimer (born 1964), Hong Kong actress
 Martin Reimer, German cyclist
 Neil Reimer (1921-2011), Canadian politician
 Nele Reimer, German handballer
 Patrick Reimer, German hockey player
 Paula Reimer, American scientist
 Rebecca Reimer, American politician and member of the South Dakota House of Representatives
 Uwe Reimer, German writer

Fictional characters 
 Wendy Reimer, protagonist of Casey Plett's novel Little Fish

See also
 Reimer's index of hip dislocation
 Remer (disambiguation)
 Reimers, a surname

Surnames
German-language surnames
Russian Mennonite surnames